Panaqolus tankei is a species of catfish in the family Loricariidae. It is native to South America, where it occurs in the Xingu River in Brazil. The species reaches at least 8.3 cm (3.3 inches) SL. It was described in 2016 by Christian A. Cramer and Leandro M. de Sousa primarily based on differences between this species and other members of the genus Panaqolus in coloration and patterning. FishBase does not list this species.

It appears in the aquarium trade, where it is one of several species referred to as a tiger pleco due to its striped appearance, although it may also be referred to specifically by its L-number, which is L-398.

References 

Ancistrini